Aayan Afzal Khan (15 November 2005) is an Indian-born cricketer who plays for the United Arab Emirates national cricket team. In September 2022, he was named in United Arab Emirates' T20I squad for their series against Bangladesh. He made his T20I debut on 25 September 2022, against Bangladesh. Later the same month, he was named in the United Arab Emirates squad for the 2022 ICC Men's T20 World Cup. In November 2022, he was named in United Arab Emirates' One Day International (ODI) squad for their series against Nepal. He made his ODI debut on 14 November 2022, against Nepal.

Personal life
Aayan was born in Goa, India, the son of Afzal and Shahista. He moved to the UAE with his family when he was two years old, growing up in Sharjah.

References

External links 
 

2005 births
Living people
Emirati cricketers
United Arab Emirates Twenty20 International cricketers
United Arab Emirates One Day International cricketers
Cricketers from Goa
Indian emigrants to the United Arab Emirates
Indian expatriate sportspeople in the United Arab Emirates